The Yeni Mosque (from , "New Mosque") is a historical mosque in Thessaloniki, Greece. It was built by Italian architect Vitaliano Poselli in 1902 for the city's Dönmeh community, crypto-Jewish converts to Islam. However, when the Donmeh left the city during the population exchange between Greece and Turkey, it was used to house the Archaeological Museum of Thessaloniki in 1925. Today it serves as an exhibition center.And is open to the city's Muslim population for prayers during Eid Al fitr.

Gallery

See also 
 Islam in Greece
 List of former mosques in Greece

References 

Buildings and structures in Thessaloniki
Mosques completed in 1902
20th-century mosques
Ottoman architecture in Thessaloniki
Museums in Thessaloniki
1902 establishments in Greece
Former mosques in Greece
Ottoman mosques in Greece
Religion in Thessaloniki
20th-century architecture in Greece
Mosque buildings with domes
Sabbateans